Münchberg is a German surname. Notable people with the surname include:
  (born 1948), German politician (CDU)
  (born 1946), German painter and graphic artist
  (born 1969), German literary scholar

See also 
 Müncheberg (disambiguation)

German-language surnames